Gary Mervin Thain (May 15, 1948 – December 8, 1975) was a New Zealand bassist, best known for his work with British rock band Uriah Heep.

Biography

Thain was born in Christchurch. He had two older brothers, Colin and Arthur. He recorded in Christchurch in the band "The Strangers" (not to be confused with the Australian band of the same name). He moved to Australia at the age of 17. It was there he became a member of the band "The Secrets", which eventually dissolved in 1966. Later, Thain was part of the rock trio The New Nadir, and with the drummer Peter Dawkins, he traveled from New Zealand to London, and once jammed with Jimi Hendrix before the trio split in 1969.

Thain joined the Keef Hartley Band, performing at Woodstock in 1969 and, in 1971, they toured with Uriah Heep; Uriah Heep asked him to join the band (replacing Mark Clarke) in February 1972. He stayed in the Uriah Heep until February 1975, playing on four studio albums: Demons & Wizards,  The Magician's Birthday, Sweet Freedom and Wonderworld as well as a live album,  Uriah Heep Live. Thain was also married twice, but had no children.

During his last tour in the United States with Uriah Heep, Thain suffered an electric shock at the Moody Coliseum in Dallas, Texas, on 15 September 1974, and was seriously injured. Due to his drug addiction he was not able to perform properly, and was fired by the band in early 1975 and replaced by former King Crimson bassist/vocalist, John Wetton. Thain died of respiratory failure due to a heroin overdose, on 8 December 1975, aged 27, at his flat in Norwood Green in London.

Thain, amongst musicians of his time, was considered an excellent bass player. His style of playing was melodic and progressively played compared to other bass players of his time. He rarely played along with the root of the measures, but preferred playing his own jazz, funk, or progressive bass line. Many typical professional rock bass players never attained his ability to break up a songs direction.

Thain primarily used a 1962 Fender Jazz Bass during his stint in Uriah Heep, though he also used a Gibson Thunderbird bass and a modified Fender Precision Bass. Thain's overdriven bass tone was often created using an Acoustic 360 bass amp from Acoustic Control Corporation. Thain also chose to play finger style rather than using a pick.

Albums discography

Champion Jack Dupree
Scoobydoobydoo (1969)

Martha Velez
Fiends and Angels (1970)

Keef Hartley Band
Halfbreed (1969)
The Battle of North West Six (1969)
The Time is Near (1970)
Little Big Band Live at The Marquee 1971 (1971)
Overdog (1971)
Seventy-Second Brave (1972)

Miller Anderson
Bright City (1971)

Pete York Percussion Band
The Pete York Percussion Band (1972)

Uriah Heep
Demons and Wizards (1972)
The Magician's Birthday (1972)
Uriah Heep Live (1973)
Sweet Freedom (1973)
Wonderworld (1974)
Live at Shepperton '74 (1986)

Ken Hensley
Proud Words on a Dusty Shelf (1973)

Me and the Others / The New Nadir
Uncovered (2009)

Singles discography

The Strangers
 1963: "My Blue Heaven"/"The Dark at the Top of The Stairs" 
 1964: "Pretend"/"Alright" 
 1965: "Can't Help Forgiving You"/"I'll Never Be Blue"

The Secrets
 1965: "It's You"/"You're Wrong"
 1966: "Me and the Others"/"Love Is Not a Game"

Champion Jack Dupree
 1969: "Ba La Fouche" (MT/Jack Dupree)/"Kansas City" (Jerry Leiber and Mike Stoller)

Martha Velez
 1969: "Tell Mama"/"Swamp Man"

Keef Hartley Band
 1969: "Don't Be Afraid"/"Hickory"
 1969: "Halfbreed"/"Waiting Around"
 1969: "Just to Cry"/"Leave It 'Til The Morning"
 1969: "Plain Talkin'"/"We Are All the Same"
 1970: "Roundabout"/"Roundabout pt 2"
 1973: "Dance to the Music"/"You and Me"

See also
27 Club

References

External links
AudioCulture profile

1948 births
1975 deaths
20th-century bass guitarists
New Zealand rock musicians
People from Christchurch
Uriah Heep (band) members
Rock bass guitarists
Deaths by heroin overdose in England